Rory Darge (born 23 February 2000) is a Scotland international rugby union player for Glasgow Warriors in the United Rugby Championship. Darge's primary position is flanker. He previously played for Southern Knights and Edinburgh Rugby.

Rugby Union career

Professional career

Darge was part of the Edinburgh academy, before signing his first professional contract in July 2019 for Super 6 side Southern Knights where he won Southern Knights youth player of the year in his first season.

At the start of the 2020-21 season he signed for Edinburgh Rugby. He made his debut for Edinburgh in Round 6 of the 2020–21 URC against Leinster.

On 16 April 2021 it was announced that he would move to Glasgow Warriors ahead of the new URC season and that he had signed ahead of the 2021-22 season.

International career

In June 2021 Darge was called up to the Scotland squad for the Summer internationals.

He made his debut for Scotland in the Six Nations match against Wales on 12 February 2022.

International tries

References

External links

2000 births
Living people
Edinburgh Rugby players
Rugby union flankers
Rugby union players from Edinburgh
Glasgow Warriors players
Scottish rugby union players
Scotland international rugby union players